is a first-person perspective survival horror game designed by Kazuya Asano and Takemaru Abiko. It is part of the Guild02 series, released for the 3DS eShop in 2013.

Reception

The game received "mixed" reviews according to the review aggregation website Metacritic.

References

External links
 

Guild (video game series)
2013 video games
First-person video games
Level-5 (company) games
Nintendo 3DS eShop games
Nintendo 3DS-only games
Science fiction video games
Survival horror video games
Video games developed in Japan

Video games set in outer space